In United States trademark law, the Principal Register is the primary register of trademarks maintained by the United States Patent and Trademark Office.  It is governed by Subchapter I of the Lanham Act.

Having a mark registered under the Principal Register confers certain benefits on the holder of the mark.  Among them are:

 Nationwide constructive use and constructive notice, which cuts off rights of other users for similar marks
 The possibility of achieving incontestable status after five years (which cuts off certain defenses of potential infringement defendants)
 The right to bring a federal cause of action for infringement without regard to diversity or amount in controversy
 The right to request U.S. Customs and Border Protection officials to bar importation of goods bearing infringing trademarks
 Provisions for treble damages, attorney fees, and various other remedies.

Trademarks must be inherently distinctive, or have acquired sufficient secondary meaning, to be registered on the Principal Register.

See also
Supplemental Register

References
 Merges, Robert P., Menell, Peter S., and Lemley, Mark A.  Intellectual Property in the New Technological Age, Third Edition.  Aspen Publishers, 2003.    pp. 591–592.

External links
 Explanation of the Principal Register, from QuizLaw
 Subchapter I of the Lanham Act from the Legal Information Institute

United States trademark law